Dick's Picks Volume 14 is the 14th live album in the Dick's Picks series of releases by the Grateful Dead. It was recorded on November 30 and December 2, 1973, at Boston Music Hall in Boston, Massachusetts. Volume 14 was the last of the Dick's Picks series to be released during the lifetime of the series's namesake tape archivist, Dick Latvala.

As on Dick's Picks Volume 1, Donna Godchaux does not appear on this set as she had taken a hiatus from touring with the band due to pregnancy.

Enclosure and liner notes

Included with the release is a single sheet folded into thirds, yielding a six-page enclosure.  The front duplicates the CD's cover and  the back contains a photograph of the venue's marquee that weekend, stating that the band played there three nights and the shows were "sol out [sic]".  Inside are three pages of liner notes interspersed with black-and-white photographs of each of the band members and a single page listing the contents of and credits for the release.

Liner notes

The liner notes were written by "Michael J. Sanditen aka Tulsa" and are entitled "Baked in Beantown".

In the notes for the 11/30/73 show, Michael tells of how the band was late and "The curtain opened to an empty stage and a room full of jaws dropping to the floor."  After a few hours, once the mic stands were in place, bassist Phil Lesh appeared and apologized to the crowd, saying "You see, we thought we were supposed to be here tomorrow night."  Their first song, "Morning Dew", was "more or less a sound check."  The author writes that there were "no hard feelings over being late" and it "turned out to be a really cool scene".  He finishes this first part of the notes by stating that when the band finished he and his friends left and ventured "out into the snowy rain at 2 am."

In the notes for the 12/02/73 show, Sanditen writes that "the music was seamless" and the "second set had no break in it."  He asserts that "from start to finish this was one fine performance with little if any miscues."  In the last paragraph, he writes that for the next 23 years he and his friends traveled the country, "from Telluride to Santa Fe and New York to San Francisco," trying to "once more give ourselves the opportunity of reliving our youth".

Tulsa closes his article by writing "We are all linked together by a desire to take a ride like that just one more time."

Track listing

Disc one
"(Walk Me Out in the) Morning Dew" (Bonnie Dobson, Tim Rose) – 14:29
"Mexicali Blues" (Bob Weir, John Barlow) – 3:46
"Dire Wolf" (Jerry Garcia, Robert Hunter) – 5:09
"Black-Throated Wind" (Weir, Barlow) – 7:01
"Don't Ease Me In" (traditional) – 4:44
"Big River" (Johnny Cash) – 5:30
"They Love Each Other" (Garcia, Hunter) – 6:01
"Playing in the Band" (Weir, Mickey Hart, Hunter) – 23:18

Disc two
"Here Comes Sunshine" (Garcia, Hunter) – 11:54
"Weather Report Suite" (Weir, Eric Anderson, Barlow) – 14:44 →
"Prelude" (Weir)
"Part 1" (Eric Andersen, Weir)
"Part 2: Let it Grow" (Barlow, Weir)
"Dark Star Jam" (Garcia, Kreutzmann, Lesh, McKernan, Weir, Hunter) – 9:18 →
"Eyes of the World" (Garcia, Hunter) – 19:26 →
"Sugar Magnolia" (Hunter, Weir) – 10:16

Disc three
"Cold Rain and Snow" (traditional) – 7:21
"Beat It on Down the Line" (Jesse Fuller) – 3:40
"Brown-Eyed Women" (Garcia, Hunter) – 7:48
"The Merry-Go-Round Broke Down" (Franklin, Friend)
"Beer Barrel Polka" (Brown, Timm, Vejvoda, Zeman)
 "Jack Straw" (Hunter, Weir) – 5:21
"Ramble on Rose" (Garcia, Hunter) – 8:04
"Weather Report Suite" (Anderson, Barlow, Weir) – 15:54
"Wharf Rat" (Garcia, Hunter) – 10:38 →
"Mississippi Half-Step Uptown Toodleloo" (Garcia, Hunter) – 8:03 →

Disc four
"Playing in the Band" (Weir, Hart, Hunter) – 12:09 →
"Jam" (Grateful Dead) – 15:39 →
"He's Gone" (Garcia, Hunter) – 10:27 →
"Truckin'" (Garcia, Phil Lesh, Weir, Hunter) – 13:34 →
"Stella Blue" (Garcia, Hunter) – 10:15
"Morning Dew" (Dobson, Rose) – 14:31

Personnel 
Grateful Dead:
Jerry Garcia – lead guitar, vocals
Keith Godchaux – keyboards
Bill Kreutzmann – drums
Phil Lesh – electric bass, vocals
Bob Weir – rhythm guitar, vocals

Production:
Bill Candelario – recording
Dick Latvala – tape archivist
Jeffrey Norman – CD mastering
John Cutler – ferromagnetist
Gecko Graphics – design
Michael J. Sanditen – photography

Recording dates
November 30 – Discs 1 & 2
December 2 – Discs 3 & 4

References

14
1999 live albums